Thomas A. Matthews is an American astronomer.  He is credited with being one of the discoverers of the first quasar, 3C 48, in 1960 using a new interferometer at the Owens Valley Radio Observatory, along with Allan Sandage.

Matthews received his PhD from Harvard University in 1956.  His advisor was Bart Bok.

References

20th-century American astronomers
American cosmologists
University of Maryland, College Park faculty
Radio astronomers
Harvard University alumni
Living people
Year of birth missing (living people)
Place of birth missing (living people)